Siddi may refer to:

 Sidi, an Arabic honorific
 Siddi, an ethnic group of Pakistan and India of African descent
 Siddis of Karnataka 
 Siddhi, a Hindu spiritual term
 Siddi, Sardinia, the Italian comune
 Siddi, Nepal, village in Nepal
 Antonio Siddi (1923-1983), Italian sprinter
 Siddy, an upcoming Malayalam film